The Widow's Son is the sixth studio album by American hip hop recording artist Apathy. It was released on March 2, 2018, through Dirty Version records. It features guest appearances from Pharoahe Monch, M.O.P., Celph Titled, A.G., Locksmith, Ryu and Diabolic. The album contains production work from Apathy himself as well as from DJ Premier, Pete Rock, Buckwild, Nottz, Stu Bangas, and Chumzilla.

Track listing
 The Spellbook – 3:43
 CHAOS – 2:36
 Never Fall Off (featuring A.G.) – 3:33
 The Widow's Son (featuring Ryu) – 3:41
 The Order – 3:44
 Alien Weaponry – 3:44
 Hypnosis (featuring Brevi) – 4:04
 I Keep On (featuring Pharoahe Monch & Pete Rock) – 3:30
 A View Of Hell [Hell Of A View] – 3:38
 Fist Of The North Star (featuring Diabolic) – 3:46
 STOMP RAPPERS (featuring Celph Titled & M.O.P.) – 3:48
 Legend Of The 3rd Degree – 3:59 
 Rise And Shine (featuring Locksmith) – 2:47
 Obi Wan – 3:57

References

Apathy (rapper) albums
2018 albums